José Luis Pérez may refer to:
 José Luis Pérez (equestrian)
 José Luis Pérez (wrestler)

See also
 José Luis Pérez de Arteaga, Spanish announcer, critic, journalist, and musicologist